The 2008 Indonesia Open Superseries in badminton is the sixth tournament of the 2008 BWF Superseries. It was held in Jakarta from 16 to 22 June 2008.

Men's singles

Seeds
 Lee Chong Wei (withdrew)
 Bao Chunlai (semifinals)
 Chen Jin (withdrew)
 Sony Dwi Kuncoro (champion)
 Taufik Hidayat (withdrew)
 Peter Gade (second round)
 Przemysław Wacha (quarterfinals)
 Simon Santoso (final)

Finals

Top half

Section 1

Section 2

Bottom half

Section 3

Section 4

Women's singles

Seeds

 Zhu Lin (champions)
 Zhang Ning (semifinals)
 Pi Hongyan (semifinals)
 Tine Rasmussen (first round)
 Wang Chen (quarterfinals)
 Wong Mew Choo (withdrew)
 Zhou Mi (quarterfinals)
 Yip Pui Yin (second round)

Finals

Top half

Section 1

Section 2

Bottom half

Section 3

Section 4

Men's doubles

Seeds

 Markis Kido / Hendra Setiawan (quarterfinals)
 Cai Yun / Fu Haifeng (withdrew)
 Alvent Yulianto / Luluk Hadiyanto (second round)
 Shintaro Ikeda / Shuichi Sakamoto (second round)
 Tony Gunawan /  Candra Wijaya (final)
 Keita Masuda / Tadashi Ōtsuka (quarterfinals)
 Mathias Boe / Carsten Mogensen (quarterfinals)
 Mohd Zakry Abdul Latif / Mohd Fairuzizuan Mohd Tazari (champions)

Finals

Top half

Section 1

Section 2

Bottom half

Section 3

Section 4

Women's doubles

Seeds

 Wei Yili / Zhang Yawen (semifinals)
 Kumiko Ogura / Reiko Shiota (second round)
 Miyuki Maeda / Satoko Suetsuna (final)
 Vita Marissa / Liliyana Natsir (champions)
 Chin Eei Hui / Wong Pei Tty (quarterfinals) Lena Frier Kristiansen / Kamilla Rytter Juhl (second round) Jo Novita / Greysia Polii (quarterfinals)
 Ha Jung-eun / Kim Min-jung (quarterfinals)

Finals

Mixed doubles

Seeds

 Nova Widianto / Liliyana Natsir (semifinals)
 Zheng Bo / Gao Ling (champions)
 Flandy Limpele / Vita Marissa (semifinals)
 Thomas Laybourn / Kamilla Rytter Juhl (final)
 Robert Mateusiak / Nadieżda Kostiuczyk (withdrew)
 Chen Hung-ling / Chou Chia-chi (first round)
 Robert Blair /  Imogen Bankier (quarterfinals)
 Keita Masuda / Miyuki Maeda (second round)

Finals

External links
Indonesia Super Series 2008 at tournamentsoftware.com

Indonesia Open (badminton)
Sports competitions in Jakarta
2008 in Indonesian sport
Indonesia